NXT TakeOver was a series of periodic professional wrestling events produced by WWE, a professional wrestling promotion based in Connecticut. The events were produced exclusively for the promotion's NXT brand division and aired live on pay-per-view (PPV) and the livestreaming services Peacock and the WWE Network. The first TakeOver event was simply titled TakeOver and was held on May 29, 2014. TakeOver events were then held several times a year. The events were originally streamed exclusively on the WWE Network until TakeOver 31 in October 2020, when the events also became available on traditional PPV before also becoming available on Peacock in early 2021. The TakeOver series came to an end following TakeOver 36 in August 2021, as in September, NXT was restructured as NXT 2.0 with the brand's succeeding events no longer carrying the TakeOver name, including some former TakeOver events.

With the establishment of NXT UK in 2018—a sister brand of NXT based in the United Kingdom—the brand adopted the TakeOver name for their live events as well.

History
In 2012, WWE restructured their NXT brand from being a reality-based competition television show to a developmental territory for their main roster. In February 2014, the brand held its first live special that was uniquely titled Arrival, which was also the very first event to air live on WWE's online streaming service, the WWE Network, which launched earlier that same month. However, after NXT held an event titled TakeOver in May that year, the "TakeOver" name became the branding for all NXT live specials. All NXT live specials were initially held at Full Sail University in Winter Park, Florida, as with the main NXT series. They were also originally exclusive to the WWE Network until TakeOver 31 in October 2020 when they also became available on traditional pay-per-view (PPV), before also becoming available on Peacock after the American version of the WWE Network merged under Peacock in March 2021.

Beginning with TakeOver: Brooklyn in 2015, the events were held at various U.S. and international locations, with most TakeOvers being named after their host city or U.S. state, which also began with that Brooklyn event. Due to the COVID-19 pandemic, however, all NXT events returned to Full Sail University in mid-March 2020 until TakeOver 31 that October, when events were moved to the WWE Performance Center in Orlando, Florida, presented as a virtual fan viewing experience with a small live crowd called the "Capitol Wrestling Center", an homage to the Capitol Wrestling Corporation, the predecessor to WWE. The Capitol Wrestling Center was similar to the WWE ThunderDome, which was a bio-secure bubble that the company utilized for Raw and SmackDown's programs. Most COVID restrictions were lifted in mid-2021 with the events no longer including a virtual audience and resumed having a live audience. Although the Raw and SmackDown brands resumed live touring in July 2021, NXT remained at the Capitol Wrestling Center. As TakeOvers were only held in Florida since the start of the pandemic in March 2020, they were named either by their installment number (e.g., TakeOver 31) or revived old WWE pay-per-view names (e.g., TakeOver: In Your House), with the exception of TakeOver: WarGames that year.

Since TakeOver: Brooklyn in 2015, several TakeOver events were scheduled as a support event for each of WWE's "Big Four" pay-per-view events at the time (Royal Rumble, WrestleMania, SummerSlam, and Survivor Series), and occasionally, their other monthly pay-per-views, such as Backlash and Money in the Bank. Before the COVID-19 pandemic, TakeOvers also shared the same venue as those PPVs, except when those PPVs were held in a stadium; in these cases, TakeOver was held at an arena in the same city instead. There were also recurring subseries of TakeOver events; TakeOver: Brooklyn was also the first to have its own subseries of TakeOvers. Other subseries of TakeOvers included Toronto, Chicago, In Your House, and the most prominent, WarGames, which had been held on the night preceding Survivor Series from 2017 to 2019; in 2020, it was held two weeks after Survivor Series. The event featured the namesake WarGames match as its main event. TakeOver: Stand & Deliver in April 2021 was the only TakeOver held across two nights.

Only one NXT TakeOver event had to be canceled. TakeOver: Tampa Bay was originally set to air live from the Amalie Arena in Tampa, Florida on April 4, 2020. The event was initially postponed due to the COVID-19 pandemic, which began effecting WWE's programming in mid-March; however, it was ultimately canceled with matches planned and scheduled for the event moved to weekly episodes of NXT, beginning April 1.

In September 2021, the NXT brand went through a restructuring, being rebranded as "NXT 2.0", reverting to a developmental territory for WWE. In October, it was speculated that the company may end the TakeOver series as another TakeOver event was not scheduled for 2021 after TakeOver 36 in August. On November 9, 2021, NXT's next PPV and livestreaming event was announced as WarGames to be held on December 5, 2021. Unlike the previous WarGames events, however, the announcement confirmed that the event would not be a TakeOver event, thus ending the TakeOver series. Vengeance Day, Stand & Deliver, and In Your House would also continue on as their own events following TakeOver's discontinuation, although the 2022 Vengeance Day aired as a television special instead of airing on PPV and via livestreaming, while the 2022 editions of Stand & Deliver and In Your House only aired via livestreaming and not on PPV.

Although the TakeOver series was discontinued, the Mat Men Podcast reported that WWE may use the TakeOver name again if an NXT event is held in a large venue, such as sharing the same venue with one of WWE's major events, and held as a support show for one of those events, like several previous TakeOvers had done.

Events

See also 
 List of WWE pay-per-view and WWE Network events

References

External links 
 Official website of WWE NXT

 
WWE lists